Carbon County is a county in the Commonwealth of Pennsylvania. It is located in Northeastern Pennsylvania. As of the 2020 census, the population was 64,749. The county is also part of Pennsylvania's Coal Region and Northeastern Pennsylvania.

The county seat of Carbon County is Jim Thorpe, which was founded in 1818 as Mauch Chunk and served as a company town of the Lehigh Coal & Navigation Company. The Lehigh River, a  tributary of the Delaware River, flows through Carbon County.

History

Moravian settlement 
In 1745, the first colonial settlement in Carbon County was established by a Moravian mission in Gnadenhutten, which is present day Lehighton. By 1752, increased hostility put Gnadenhutten at risk for attack, and in 1755 the community was attacked by Native Americans. The settlement at the Lehigh Gap failed and colonizers didn't reenter the area before the late 1780.

Discovery of coal 
In 1791, a homesteader, Phillip Ginter hunting on Sharp Mountain along Pisgah Ridge found a black tone coal outcropping, and conveyed a chunk of it to Weissport.

Industrialization

Lehigh Coal Mine Company (LCMC) operations had managed to open up the mouth area of the Nesquehoning Creek by 1800.  This area became known as Lausanne, or Lausanne Landing, after the Inn & Tavern built there called Landing Tavern.  An Amerindian trail crossed the stream near the confluence with Jean's Run and the camp grounds of their boat builders, climbing northwestwards along a traverse to the next water gap west, eroded into the southern flank of Broad Mountain in the Lehigh Valley.  It connected across a barrier ridge whose waters originated in the saddle-pass in which Hazleton, Pennsylvania was built. The trail would become the Lehigh & Susquehanna Turnpike in 1804. Today, Pennsylvania Route 93 follows this route with the exception of where modern road building capabilities allowed improved positioning. This road cut off  from a trip from Philadelphia to the Wyoming Valley and the northern sections of the Coal Region.

Lehigh Coal & Navigation Company
In 1827, Lehigh Coal & Navigation Company, based in present-day Jim Thorpe, launched the Mauch Chunk Switchback Railway, the nation's second operating railroad. The Beaver Meadow Railroad and Coal Company, also located in Carbon County, was the first railway to operate steam locomotives as traction engines and prime movers in the United States. The Mauch Chunck Switchback Railway connected mines west of Beaver Meadows and Weatherly to the Lehigh Canal opposite Lehighton.

County's founding
Carbon County was created on March 13, 1843 from parts of Northampton and Monroe counties and was named for the extensive deposits of anthracite coal in the region, where it was first discovered in 1791. Early attempts were made to exploit the deposits by the Lehigh Coal Mine Company (1792), whose expeditions broke trail and pioneered river bank sites using mule powered technology to log, saw, and build arks to carry bags of coal to Philadelphia with only scant success.

Molly Maguires
In the 19th century, Carbon County was the location of trials and executions of the Molly Maguires, an Irish secret society that had been accused of terrorizing the region.

Geography

Blue Mountain forms the southern boundary of Carbon. The northeast area of the county is located in the Pocono Mountains and the northwest area includes portions of Broad and Spring mountains. It is drained by the Lehigh River except for a small area in western Packer Township and the borough of Lansford that are drained by the Still Creek and Panther Creek, respectively, into the Little Schuylkill River and the Schuylkill River, and the Audenried area in the northwest corner that drains into the Susquehanna River via the Catawissa Creek. The Lehigh cuts a gorge between Jim Thorpe and White Haven which hosts the Lehigh Gorge State Park.

Climate
Carbon County has a humid continental climate (Dfa/Dfb) and is mostly in hardiness zone 6a, except for 6b in some southern lowlands and 5b in some northern highlands. Average monthly temperatures at Jake Arner Memorial Airport range from 27.8 °F in January to 72.5 °F in July, while at the Pocono interchange of the Turnpike they range from 22.9 °F in January to 68.3 °F in July.

Adjacent counties
Luzerne County (north)
Monroe County (east)
Northampton County (southeast)
Lehigh County (south)
Schuylkill County (southwest)

Transportation

Major highways

Buses
Carbon Transit fixed-route bus service consists of Route 701 (Coaldale-Palmerton) and Route 702 (Nesquehoning-Palmerton), both connecting to the LANTA Route 325 bus in Palmerton. Carbon Transit also operates CT Flex service in Jim Thorpe, Penn Forest Township, and Kidder Township. Also, Hazleton Public Transit (HPT) bus route 30 serves northwestern Carbon County via Beaver Meadows and Junedale to Weatherly. Audenried is served by HPT route 20 (Hazleton-McAdoo/Kelayres). Fullington Trailways provides intercity service to Carbon County with stops in Lehighton and Jim Thorpe. Martz Trailways has a stop in Kidder Township near the Pocono interchange of Interstate 476 for service between Scranton, Wilkes-Barre, Allentown, Quakertown, and Philadelphia. This is an Amtrak Thruway Motorcoach route, connecting to Amtrak trains at 30th Street Station in Philadelphia. Martz also operates casino bus routes to Atlantic City from the stop.

Airports
Jake Arner Memorial Airport in Lehighton provides general aviation. The nearest commercial passenger service is at Lehigh Valley International Airport or Wilkes-Barre/Scranton International Airport.

Demographics

As of the census of 2000, there were 58,802 people, 23,701 households, and 16,424 families residing in the county.  The population density was 154 people per square mile (60/km2).  There were 30,492 housing units at an average density of 80 per square mile (31/km2).  The racial makeup of the county was 97.82% White, 0.60% Black or African American, 0.16% Native American, 0.31% Asian, 0.03% Pacific Islander, 0.32% from other races, and 0.76% from two or more races.  1.46% of the population were Hispanic or Latino of any race. 29.4% were of German, 10.1% Irish, 9.2% Italian, 7.9% American, 6.6% Slovak, 6.0% Polish and 5.8% Ukrainian ancestry.

There were 23,701 households, out of which 28.70% had children under the age of 18 living with them, 54.80% were married couples living together, 9.90% had a female householder with no husband present, and 30.70% were non-families. 26.00% of all households were made up of individuals, and 13.50% had someone living alone who was 65 years of age or older.  The average household size was 2.44 and the average family size was 2.93.

In the county, the population was spread out, with 22.20% under the age of 18, 6.90% from 18 to 24, 28.30% from 25 to 44, 24.20% from 45 to 64, and 18.50% who were 65 years of age or older.  The median age was 41 years. For every 100 females there were 94.90 males.  For every 100 females age 18 and over, there were 92.30 males.

2020 Census

Law and government

|}
Carbon County has long been considered a bellwether county for Pennsylvania statewide elections. In gubernatorial elections, it was perfect from 1952 to 2014.  At the presidential level, Carbon County was also a bellwether for Pennsylvania (although not the nation) until recently, with only 1 miss (in 1960) from 1916 to 2000, and with a margin within 3.5 points of the statewide margin in every election from 1940 to 2000 except 1964 (5.3% more Democratic) and 1976 (6.9% more Democratic). However, since then the county has trended Republican relative to the state as a whole, with McCain outperforming in Carbon by 8.5% relative to the state and Romney outperforming by 12.9%.
Republicans hold the commissioner majority while Democrats hold all county row offices. Al Gore carried it in 2000, and in 2004, Republican George W. Bush defeated Democrat John Kerry 49.99% to 48.81% or a margin of 296 votes.

In 2020, Donald Trump won the county with 65.4% of the vote, the largest presidential victory any presidential candidate since Lyndon Johnson's landslide in 1964.

County commissioners
Wayne Nothstein, Chairman, Republican
Chris Lukasevich, Republican
Rocky Ahner, Democratic

State Senate
 John Yudichak, Independent, Pennsylvania's 14th Senatorial District
 Dave Argall, Republican, Pennsylvania's 29th Senatorial District

State House of Representatives
 Doyle Heffley, Republican, Pennsylvania's 122nd Representative District

United States House of Representatives
 Susan Wild, Democrat, Pennsylvania's 7th congressional district

United States Senate
John Fetterman, Democrat
Bob Casey, Democrat

Education

Community, junior and technical colleges
Lehigh Carbon Community College – Carbon Campus, Schnecksville, Pennsylvania

Public school districts
 Hazleton Area School District (also in Luzerne County and Schuylkill County)
 Jim Thorpe Area School District
 Lehighton Area School District
 Palmerton Area School District
 Panther Valley School District (also in Schuylkill County)
 Weatherly Area School District

Career technical school
Carbon Career and Technical Institute, public school located in Jim Thorpe

Intermediate Unit
The public and private K-12 schools in Carbon County are served by Carbon-Lehigh Intermediate Unit 21.

Recreation

Mauch Chunk Lake is a county-run park that offers swimming, camping, hiking and cross country skiing in the winter. There are three Pennsylvania state parks in Carbon County:
Beltzville State Park
Hickory Run State Park
Lehigh Gorge State Park stretches along the Lehigh River in Luzerne County and into Carbon County.

Municipalities
Under Pennsylvania law, there are four types of incorporated municipalities: cities, boroughs, townships, and, in the case of Bloomsburg, a town. The following boroughs and townships are located in Carbon County:

Boroughs

Beaver Meadows
Bowmanstown
East Side
Jim Thorpe (county seat)
Lansford
Lehighton
Nesquehoning
Palmerton
Parryville
Summit Hill
Weatherly
Weissport

Townships

Banks
East Penn
Franklin
Kidder
Lausanne
Lehigh
Lower Towamensing
Mahoning
Packer
Penn Forest
Towamensing

Census-designated places
Census-designated places are geographical areas designated by the U.S. Census Bureau for the purposes of compiling demographic data. They are not actual jurisdictions under Pennsylvania law. Other unincorporated communities, such as villages, may be listed here as well.

Albrightsville
Holiday Pocono
Indian Mountain Lake
Towamensing Trails
Tresckow
Weissport East

Former communities
 Big Creek Valley
 East Mauch Chunk, now an eastern part of Jim Thorpe, Pennsylvania
 East Penn Township, Pennsylvania, the far eastern part of today's Jim Thorpe at the other end of Bear Mountain (Lehigh Valley)
 Lausanne Landing, the original settlement above the Lehigh Gap at the mouth of the Nesquehoning Creek; terminus of the Lehigh & Susquehanna Turnpike founded in 1804
 Mauch Chunk, Pennsylvania

Population ranking
The population ranking of the following table is based on the 2010 census of Carbon County.

† county seat

See also
 National Register of Historic Places listings in Carbon County, Pennsylvania
 Quakake Tunnel

References

External links

Official county website

 
1843 establishments in Pennsylvania
Anthracite Coal Region of Pennsylvania
Counties of Appalachia
Pocono Mountains
Populated places established in 1843